Bat Shalom is one of the organizations of the Coalition of Women for a Just Peace. They are a feminist Israeli-Palestinian non-governmental organization, a merging of two previous organizations: Israel’s Bat Shalom, and the Jerusalem Center for Women. They work together through another group, The Jerusalem Link. Their main goal is to resolve the Israeli-Palestinian conflict, with resolutions for Israeli and Palestinian women as their highest priorities. They also created a list of specific goals in mind that they believe must be essential to the overall resolution of the Israeli-Palestinian conflict.

History
In 1989, prominent Israeli and Palestinian women peace activists convened a meeting in Brussels. The meeting initiated an ongoing dialogue that in 1994 resulted in the establishment of The Jerusalem Link comprising two women's organizations—Bat Shalom on the Israeli side, and the Jerusalem Center for Women on the Palestinian side.

See also

 List of Palestine solidarity organizations
 Israeli–Palestinian conflict
 Anarchists Against the Wall
 Arab–Israeli conflict
 Jewish Voices for Peace
 Machsom Watch
 Yesh Din
 Shovrim Shtika (Breaking the Silence)
 Jews Against the Occupation
 Machsom Watch
 Jerusalem Center For Women
 Rabbis for Human Rights
 The Jerusalem Fund

References

External links
 Bat Shalom website
 Marcaz al-Quds la l-Nissah – Jerusalem Center For Women website

Feminism in the Arab world
Feminism in the State of Palestine
Human rights organizations based in Israel
Jewish anti-occupation groups
Jewish feminism
Non-governmental organizations involved in the Israeli–Palestinian conflict
Political organizations based in Israel
Women's organizations based in Israel
Feminist organizations in Israel